Akrofuom is a town on Gyimi River in the Ashanti Region of Ghana. It is the capital of the Akrofuom District. The town is known for the Akrofuom Senior High Technical School.  The school is a second cycle institution.

Ashanti Goldfield Corporation 

The Ashanti Goldfield Corporation operated a  gauge railway near Akrofuom. They used a  well tank locomotive built by Hudswell Clarke as No. 1238 of 1916. It was, however, plated as Robert Hudson, who had placed the order. Its working life ended in 1952 when it fell into a river near Akrofuom, killing its driver and was abandoned.

References

Populated places in the Ashanti Region
2 ft gauge railways